Sabino is a Central Italian dialect spoken in Central Italy, precisely in an area which includes the northern part of the province of Aquila and the whole province of Rieti, with some linguistic islands in the province of Rome. It preserves the Late Latin vocalism, also known as archaic vocalism.

It is divided into three main groups, each one representing a local form of Sabino.

 Aquilano (also known as Cicolano-Reatino-Aquilano): it is the most important dialect of Sabino and it is considered the standard form. The area where it is spoken covers the largest part of Sabino's zone, in the province of Rieti and in the northern province of Aquila.
 Carseolano or Sublacense, a form of Sabino spoken in province of Rome (Subiaco) and in Carsoli.
 Tagliacozzano, a transitional form of Sabino with Southern Italian which is spoken in Tagliacozzo, Scurcola Marsicana and in upper Liri Valley.

Common features
Many authors consider Sabino as an independent group of Italian language distinguished from Central Italian. It is the only dialect which keeps the two affixes -o and -u of Late Latin, so there are words like  'horse', from Latin , and  'I write', from Latin .
In a large zone between Rieti and Aniene Valley local dialects keeps the Late Latin vocalic system: words in which stressed vowels are e or o the final affix is -o, in words in which stressed vowel are i or u the final affix is -u ( 'rich',  'new',  'man',  'eight').
Apocope of infinitive affixes:  'to eat',  'to kill', 'to sleep'.
Splitting of -RR- in Rieti district ( < TERRA, 'soil').

See also 
 Central Italian
 Southern Italian
 Languages of Italy
 Sabine language

External links 
 Songs in Reatino

Dialects of Italian